Khristiyan Yevgenyevich Brauzman (born 15 August 2003) is a Kyrgyzstani footballer who currently plays for Abdysh-Ata Kant.

Career statistics

Club

International

References

2003 births
Living people
Kyrgyzstani footballers
Kyrgyzstan youth international footballers
Kyrgyzstan international footballers
Association football defenders
Kyrgyz Premier League players
Eskişehirspor footballers
FC Abdysh-Ata Kant players
Kyrgyzstani expatriate footballers
Kyrgyzstani expatriate sportspeople in Turkey
Expatriate footballers in Turkey
Kyrgyzstani people of German descent